Susan Allbritton Murphy (born April 16, 1958) is an American statistician, known for her work applying statistical methods to clinical trials of treatments for chronic and relapsing medical conditions. She is a professor at Harvard University, a MacArthur Fellow, and a member of the National Academy of Sciences.

Biography and career 
She grew up in rural Louisiana, and is "a serious hockey player."
She graduated from Louisiana State University with a B.S. and from the University of North Carolina with a Ph.D. Her 1989 dissertation, Time-Dependent Coefficients in a Cox-Type Regression Model, was supervised by Pranab K. Sen.

Murphy was an Assistant and Associate Professor of Statistics at Pennsylvania State University from fall 1989 to fall 1997. She was an Associate and full Professor of Statistics at the University of Michigan from spring 1998 to summer 2017. She is a Professor of Statistics at Harvard University as of fall 2017. She is also a principal investigator at The Methodology Center, at Penn State.

She is developing "new methodologies to evaluate courses of treatment for individuals coping with chronic or relapsing disorders ... Murphy’s Sequential Multiple Assignment Randomized Trial (SMART) is a means for learning how best to dynamically adapt treatment to each individual’s response over time. Using SMART, clinicians assess and modify patients’ treatments during the trial, an approach with potential applications in the treatment of a range of chronic diseases—such as ADHD, alcoholism, drug addiction, HIV/AIDS, and cardiovascular disease—that involve therapies that are regularly reconsidered and replaced as the disease progresses.

Murphy is a Professor of Statistics at Harvard University and a Professor of Computer Science at the Harvard John A. Paulson School of Engineering and Applied Sciences. She is also affiliated with Harvard's Radcliffe Institute for Advanced Study as a Radcliffe Alumnae Professor.

Recognition
She won a 2013 MacArthur Fellowship. In 2015 she gave the Bradley Lecture at the University of Georgia. In 2016, she was elected to the National Academy of Sciences. She was the R. A. Fisher Lecturer in 2018. In 2018, she was elected president of the Institute of Mathematical Statistics. 

She is also a Fellow of the American Statistical Association and of the Institute of Mathematical Statistics.

See also 
Dynamic treatment regime

References 

American statisticians
Women statisticians
1958 births
Living people
Louisiana State University alumni
University of Michigan faculty
Fellows of the American Statistical Association
Fellows of the Institute of Mathematical Statistics
MacArthur Fellows
Members of the United States National Academy of Sciences
Annals of Statistics editors